Pioneer High School, or similar names, may refer to:

 Pioneer State High School, Andergrove, Mackay, Queensland, Australia
 Pioneer House High School, Manchester, England
 Pioneer High School (Anand), in Gujarat, India
 Pioneer School of Ariana, Tunisia
 Pioneer School of Gafsa, Tunisia

United States
 Pioneer High School (Los Angeles County, California)
 Pioneer High School, in Redding, California
 Pioneer High School (San Jose, California)
 Pioneer Valley High School, Santa Maria, California
 Pioneer High School (Whittier, California)
 Pioneer High School (Woodland, California)
 Pioneer Junior-Senior High School, Royal Center, Indiana
 Pioneer Valley Regional School, Northfield, Massachusetts, including high school
 Pioneer High School (Ann Arbor, Michigan)
 Pioneer Secondary Alternative High School, Prineville, Oregon
 Sharyland Pioneer High School, Hidalgo County, Texas
 Pioneer High School for the Performing Arts, in American Fork, Utah

See also
 Pioneer Secondary School, Jurong West, Singapore
 Pioneer Middle School  (disambiguation)